The 2014–15 Vancouver Canucks season was the franchise's 45th season in the NHL. The Canucks managed to qualify for the playoffs for the first time since the 2012–13 season. The team would not appear in the post season again until the 2019-20 NHL Season.

Off-season
On April 8, 2014, after missing the playoffs for the first time since 2008, the team fired general manager Mike Gillis. One day later, ownership hired former Canucks captain Trevor Linden as team president, to assist in the search for a new general manager. Three weeks after Linden was hired, the Canucks announced that both head coach John Tortorella and assistant coach Mike Sullivan, who had only just been hired prior to the start of the 2013–14 season, were fired. Throughout the search for Vancouver's new general manager, it was speculated that Linden's preferred candidate was Jim Benning, who was serving as an assistant general manager for the Boston Bruins. On May 21, the Canucks confirmed that Benning had been hired as their new general manager. One of Benning's first changes to the roster was buying out David Booth, who had one year remaining on his contract. As a result of the buyout, Booth became an unrestricted free agent, and he will receive $1,583,333 per year (over the next two seasons) from the Canucks; Booth's buyout salary will not be applied to Vancouver's salary cap. The next major task for the Canucks was finding a new head coach. Among the candidates Benning interviewed were New York Rangers assistant coach Scott Arniel, and former Pittsburgh Penguins coach Dan Bylsma. Additionally, Texas Stars head coach Willie Desjardins was also one the coaches Benning was long rumoured to have interest in. However, Benning was not able to interview Desjardins until late June, as Desjardins had just won the Calder Cup with Texas. On June 23, the Canucks officially introduced Desjardins as the 18th head coach in Canucks history. The next major tasks facing Benning were dealing with the trade request of Ryan Kesler, and preparing for the draft on June 27. On draft day, Benning completed a series of trades before the Canucks even made their first pick. Jason Garrison was traded to the Tampa Bay Lightning for a 2nd-round draft pick, and then Ryan Kesler was traded to the Anaheim Ducks for Nick Bonino, Luca Sbisa, the twenty-fourth overall pick, and a 3rd-round draft pick. Benning then flipped Anaheim's 3rd-round pick to the New York Rangers, in exchange for Derek Dorsett. On June 28 (the second day of the draft), Benning acquired Linden Vey from the Los Angeles Kings, in exchange for Tampa Bay's 2nd-round pick (acquired the day before in the Garrison trade). As a result of trading away Roberto Luongo in March, the Canucks were left with a goalie tandem of Eddie Lack and Jacob Markstrom, who together had combined for 88 games of NHL experience. Thus, Benning's first move on July 1 was to sign free-agent goalie Ryan Miller to a 3-year, $18 million contract, in order to bring a veteran presence to Vancouver's goaltending position. Benning's next major transaction occurred only one day after acquiring Miller, as he signed former Phoenix Coyotes winger Radim Vrbata to a 2-year, $10 million contract. On July 3, Benning signed restricted free agent Zack Kassian to a 2-year, $3.5 million deal. On July 5, the Canucks re-signed defenceman Christopher Tanev to a 1-year, $2 million contract, only hours before the deadline to file for salary arbitration. On July 7, Benning named Doug Lidster as an assistant coach for the Canucks; Lidster had also recently served as an assistant coach to new Canucks head coach Willie Desjardins on the Texas Stars.

Regular season

October

November

On November 4, rookie Bo Horvat made his NHL debut against the Colorado Avalanche; it was a winning debut for Horvat as the Canucks rally from a 2-0 deficit to defeat the Colorado Avalanche 5-2. On November 20, Bo Horvat scored his first NHL goal against the Anaheim Ducks, the Canucks went onto lose the game 4-3 in a shootout. On November 23, Daniel Sedin played his 1000th NHL game against the Chicago Blackhawks; the Canucks went on to defeat the Blackhawks by a final score of 4-1, forward Jannik Hansen also scored his first career hat trick this game.

December

The Vancouver Canucks began struggling after losing to the Toronto Maple Leafs 5–2. They lost five games in a row and finally ended their struggles against the Calgary Flames with a 3–2 win in overtime.

January

February

On February 22, Ryan Miller was injured in shutout win over New York Islanders forcing Eddie Lack into the game. He would miss the next 22 games. Jacob Markstrom was called in from the Utica Comets.

March

Jacob Markstrom started against San Jose Sharks on March 3, but he was removed after he gave up three goals in four shots as the Canucks lost to the Sharks 6-2. Markstrom finally was able to win against Arizona Coyotes with a 3–1 victory

April

Canucks clinched their playoff spot after a 2–1 victory against Los Angeles Kings.

Playoffs

The Vancouver Canucks entered the playoffs as the Pacific Division's second seed. This was the seventh playoff meeting for these teams with Calgary having won four of the six previous series. Their most recent meeting was in the 2004 Western Conference Quarterfinals, which Calgary won in seven games. The Flames qualified for the playoffs for the first time since 2009. The teams split this year's four-game regular season series, with each team winning once at home and once on the road.

The Flames defeated the Canucks in six games. Calgary rallied from a one-goal deficit in Game 1, as David Jones tied the game 7:59 into the third and Kris Russell scored the winning goal with 29.6 seconds left to give the Flames a 2–1 win. The Canucks tied the series with a 4–1 win, as goalie Eddie Lack made 22 out of 23 saves and Alex Burrows recorded two assists. With 1:17 left to play, a fight broke out that resulted in 132 penalty minutes, with the Flames' Deryk Engelland given a game misconduct for instigating it, but eventually the league rescinded Engelland's penalty and instead fined Calgary head coach Bob Hartley $50,000 for his responsibility for the incident. Jonas Hiller made 23 saves to help give the Flames to a 4–2 win in Game 3. In Game 4, Calgary scored three first-period goals out of seven shots off of Lack. Ryan Miller replaced Lack to start the second period, but Hiller made 28 total saves en route to a 3–1 win.[58] Miller then made 20 saves and Daniel Sedin scored the winning goal 1:47 into the third period to help give the Canucks to a 2–1 win in Game 5. In Game 6, Hartley pulled Hiller after he allowed two goals on his first three shots, and put Karri Ramo in net. The Flames tied the game in the second period, and then Matt Stajan scored what proved to be the game-winning goal late in the third period. Two empty net goals in the final minute of the game sealed the series victory for the Flames.

Standings

Schedule and results

Pre-season

Regular season

Detailed records

Playoffs

Player statistics

Skaters

Goaltenders

†Traded to Canucks mid-season. Stats reflect time with Canucks only.

Notable achievements

Awards

Milestones

Records

Transactions
The Canucks been involved in the following transactions:

Trades

Free agents acquired

Free agents lost

Claimed via waivers

Player signings

Suspensions and fines

Draft picks

The 2014 NHL Entry Draft was held on June 27–28, 2014, at the Wells Fargo Center in Philadelphia, Pennsylvania. The Canucks had following picks:

Draft notes
 Anaheim's first-round pick went to Vancouver, as the result of a trade on June 27, 2014, that sent Ryan Kesler and a third-round pick in 2015 to Anaheim, in exchange for Nick Bonino, Luca Sbisa, a third-round pick in 2014, and this pick.
 Vancouver's fourth-round pick went to Carolina, as the result of a trade on September 28, 2013, that sent Zac Dalpe and Jeremy Welsh to Vancouver, in exchange for Kellan Tochkin and this pick.

References

Vancouver Canucks season, 2014-15
Vancouver Canucks seasons
Vanc